Amata multicincta is a moth of the subfamily Arctiinae. It was described by George Hampson in 1914. It is found on Java.

References

multicincta